Tinwagyaung is a village in Mingin Township, Kale District, in the Sagaing Region of western Burma.

References

External links
Maplandia World Gazetteer

Populated places in Kale District
Mingin Township